Megacraspedus violacellum is a moth of the family Gelechiidae. It was described by Pierre Chrétien in 1915. It is found in North Africa, where it has been recorded from Algeria and Tunisia.

References

Moths described in 1915
Megacraspedus